Gongnong Subdistrict is a subdistrict in Hongwei District, Liaoyang, Liaoning province, China. , it has 5 residential communities under its administration.

See also 
 List of township-level divisions of Liaoning

References 

Township-level divisions of Liaoning
Liaoyang